Grou-Jirnsum is a railway station located between Grou and Jirnsum, Netherlands. Opened on 1 September 1868, it is located on the Arnhem–Leeuwarden railway. Service are operated by Nederlandse Spoorwegen. Originally named Grouw-Irnsum, it was renamed Grou-Jirnsum on 30 May 1999.

Train services
, the following train services call at this station:
1× per hour express Intercity service: The Hague - Leiden - Schiphol - Duivendrecht - Lelystad - Zwolle - Leeuwarden
1× per hour local Sprinter service: Meppel - Leeuwarden

See also
 List of railway stations in Friesland

References

External links
NS website 
Dutch Public Transport journey planner 

Railway stations in Friesland
Railway stations on the Staatslijn A
Railway stations opened in 1868